St. Cecilia School is a historic school building located at 302 West Main Street in Broussard, Louisiana.

Built in 1909, the school is a three-story Italianate brick building featuring arched windows and a large front dormer.

The building was listed on the National Register of Historic Places on March 14, 1983.

It is one of 10 individually NRHP-listed buildings in the "Broussard Multiple Resource Area", which also includes: 
Alesia House
Billeaud House
Martial Billeaud Jr. House
Valsin Broussard House 
Comeaux House
Ducrest Building
Janin Store 
Roy-LeBlanc House

St. Julien House 
Main Street Historic District

See also
 National Register of Historic Places listings in Lafayette Parish, Louisiana

References

External links
St. Cecilia School website

School buildings on the National Register of Historic Places in Louisiana
Italianate architecture in Louisiana
School buildings completed in 1909
Lafayette Parish, Louisiana
National Register of Historic Places in Lafayette Parish, Louisiana
1909 establishments in Louisiana